On 4 May 2014, two improvised explosive devices exploded on buses in Nairobi, Kenya, killing three people and injuring sixty-two. Twenty of the wounded were in critical condition after the blast.

Background 
In October 2011, Kenya deployed soldiers in a coordinated operation with the Somali military against the Al-Shabaab militant group in southern Somalia. Al-Shabaab vowed to launch attacks in Kenya in retaliation. In April 2014, Kenyan authorities announced a security operation, after several terrorist attacks.

On 3 May 2014, three people were killed and fifteen injured when a hand grenade was detonated inside a bus in Mombasa, Kenya. In another incident which occurred on the same day, an improvised explosive device was deposited within a bag on a beach. The bag was noticed, and no casualties were reported after "people took cover".

Attack 
The explosions occurred outside Safari Park hotel, and in an underpass next To TRM Mall. According to Kenya's National Disaster Operations Centre, twenty of the injured people were in a critical condition after the blast. Photos showed that one bus had a large hole in the side, and the other had its doors and windows blown off. The majority of casualties were women and children. Members of DPS-TRU (Diplomatic Protective Services - Tactical Response Unit) and DPS-K9 (Explosive Detection Unit) that were at the TRM mall at the time of explosion, raced and assisted the wounded, scanned and secured the bus for evidence as well ordered public to keep away from the bus as there was possibility of secondary explosive device. About 30-40 min later they handover it to GSU (General Service Unit) which arrived to the scene.

Initial responses 
Reports differed over the nature of the explosive devices, with some saying the "homemade explosive devices" were grenades. Initial casualty reports were of two dead and twenty-seven wounded, but that number increased as time progressed. No group or individual came forward to claim responsibility for the attacks. However, the Kenyan government blamed Al-Shabaab for the incidents.

Reactions 
Kenyan Vice President William Ruto stated that "security agencies are in pursuit of the perpetrators of this heinous and cowardly act", while Kenyan President Uhuru Kenyatta said that "the terrorists will be treated as the vicious criminals they are".

References 

2010s in Nairobi
Attacks in Africa in 2014
Bus bombings in Africa
Improvised explosive device bombings in Africa
May 2014 crimes in Africa
May 2014 events in Africa
Terrorist incidents in Kenya in 2014
2014 Nairobi bus bombings
2014 murders in Kenya